Udai Bhan Tewari is an Indian mathematician, Emeritus Professor at IITK. His research work includes contribution in the field of group algebra and measure algebra of locally compact group. He was awarded the Shanti Swaroop Bhatnagar Award for his contribution to mathematics.

References

 

20th-century Indian mathematicians
Living people
1944 births
Scientists from Uttar Pradesh
Recipients of the Shanti Swarup Bhatnagar Award in Mathematical Science